Vargı is a surname. Notable people with the surname include:

Murat Vargı (born 1947), Turkish billionaire businessman
Ömer Vargı, Turkish film director and producer